Lee Morse was an American singer, songwriter, composer, and guitarist, who worked primarily in the genres of jazz and blues music in the 1920s and 1930s. She garnered significant fame in the mid-1920s, and became one of the most celebrated recording artists in the world. She was marketed as "America’s Leading Singer of Blues and Southern Mammy Songs."

Morse's discography includes over 60 singles of both self-composed and cover recordings, most of which were released by Perfect and Columbia Records in the 1920s. Morse continued to release singles with Columbia throughout the 1930s, as well as several releases for Decca Records. By the 1930s, however, Morse's professional career was in decline, as she struggled significantly with alcoholism. She frequently missed live engagements during this period, and her output of recorded material dwindled by the latter half of the decade. 

Morse released two singles in 1950 through Decca, before dying unexpectedly in 1954. Several compilation albums chronicling her career have been released posthumously.

Singles

1920s

1930s

1950s

Compilation albums

References

Sources

External links
Lee Morse at Discogs
Miss Lee Morse and Her Blue Grass Boys at Discogs
Lee Morse (1897-1954) Red Hot Jazz Archive
Lee Morse and her Bluegrass Boys Red Hot Jazz Archive

Discographies of American artists
Blues discographies
Jazz discographies